Matt Nyman (born September 16, 1976) is a former American soccer player who played for the Tampa Bay Mutiny in the MLS and the MLS Pro-40 in the A-League.

Career statistics

Club

Notes

References

1976 births
Living people
American soccer players
Association football goalkeepers
Tampa Bay Mutiny players
MLS Pro-40 players
Major League Soccer players
A-League (1995–2004) players
Sportspeople from Middletown, Connecticut
Soccer players from Connecticut